Tudor-Andrei Boldor Boghiță (born 29 November 1997) is a Romanian rugby union Rugby player. He plays as a fly-half for professional SuperLiga club Steaua București.

Personal life
Tudor Boldor is the son of former rugby union international, Daniel Boldor, and brother of fencing champions Ana Boldor and Maria Boldor.

In January 2021 he started a contract as an image athlete for Under Armour through KVANTUM SPORT company.

International career
In November 2018, he was called for Romania's national team, the Oaks, making his international debut during Week 3 of the 2018 end-of-year rugby union internationals in a match against the Eagles.

He is the 646 Oak ever selected in the Romanian XV National Team with 11 caps, 1 try, 5 conversions, 3 penalty kicks

References

External links

1997 births
Living people
Romanian rugby union players
Romania international rugby union players
CSA Steaua București (rugby union) players
Rugby union fly-halves